Markus Kurth may refer to:

 Markus Kurth (footballer) (born 1973), German football manager and footballer
 Markus Kurth (politician) (born 1966), German politician